Route 70 is a state highway located in the U.S. state of New Jersey. It extends  from an interchange with Route 38 in Pennsauken Township, Camden County, east to an intersection with Route 34 and Route 35 in Wall Township, Monmouth County. Route 70 cuts across the middle of the state as a two-lane highway through the Pine Barrens in Burlington and Ocean counties. A popular truck route, it provides access between Philadelphia and the surrounding Delaware Valley metropolitan area and the Jersey Shore resorts, particularly Long Beach Island by way of Route 72. It is also a congested commercial route within Philadelphia's New Jersey suburbs. The western section in Cherry Hill and Marlton is a four- to eight-lane divided highway that serves as a major suburban arterial and is locally known as the Marlton Pike. The eastern section in Monmouth and Ocean counties is also a multilane divided highway that runs through suburban areas. Route 70 is officially known as the John Davison Rockefeller Memorial Highway its entire length in honor of John Davison Rockefeller.

The portion of the current route between Whitesbog and Lakehurst became a part of pre-1927 Route 18 in 1923. In 1927, Route 40 was legislated to run from Camden to Lakewood; the termini were eventually moved to the Airport Circle in Pennsauken and the Laurelton Circle in Brick Township. Route 40 became Route 70 in 1953 in order to avoid conflicting with U.S. Route 40 (US 40); in addition, the western terminus was cut back to its current location to avoid a concurrency with Route 38 and the eastern terminus was moved to the Brielle Circle, replacing a portion of Route 34 between the Laurelton Circle and the Brielle Circle.

Route description

Camden and Burlington counties

Route 70 begins at an interchange with Route 38 and County Route 601 (CR 601) in Pennsauken Township, Camden County. From this interchange, it heads to the southeast on Marlton Pike, a six-lane divided highway that runs through suburban residential and commercial areas. The road is also officially called the John Davison Rockefeller Memorial Highway for its entire length after John Davison Rockefeller. The road enters Cherry Hill and comes to a cloverleaf interchange with CR 636 before crossing under NJ Transit's Atlantic City Line, a short distance to the south of the Cherry Hill station. In this area, Route 70 passes to the south of a retail and residential development at the former site of the Garden State Park Racetrack before crossing CR 644. Past this intersection, the route narrows to four lanes and turns more to the east as it comes to the Ellisburg area. In Ellisburg, it has an intersection with Route 41 and the northern terminus of Route 154. The road runs through more suburban areas as it encounters Interstate 295 (I-295) at a cloverleaf interchange. A short distance past I-295, Route 70 passes over the New Jersey Turnpike without an interchange before widening into an eight-lane highway and continuing east to junctions with CR 674 and CR 673. Following CR 673, the road narrows back to four lanes before it encounters CR 600, a former alignment of the road known as Old Marlton Pike.

Route 70 crosses the Pennsauken Creek into Evesham Township, Burlington County, running east through more commercial areas within the Marlton section of the township. A short distance later, the route intersects Route 73 at a partial cloverleaf interchange that was formerly the Marlton Circle. After this interchange, the road heads east passing through some more commercial areas and then into residential neighborhoods that are separated from the road by trees, narrowing into a two-lane undivided road. It continues into a mix of suburban development and rural woods and farms as it crosses into Medford Township, coming to a crossroads with CR 618. From this intersection, Route 70 continues east through the Medford area, passing a couple of shopping centers before crossing CR 541. After the CR 541 intersection, the route leaves the suburban development and runs through a mix of woodland and farmland with occasional homes. It enters Southampton Township, where the road enters more wooded surroundings before coming to US 206 at the Red Lion Circle.

Past here, Route 70 loses the Marlton Pike name and continues east into the heavily wooded Pine Barrens. It passes to the south of the Leisuretowne retirement village before entering predominantly rural areas, with two fire lanes paralleling the road on either side. Route 70 eventually turns slightly to the northeast and forms the border between Southampton Township to the north and Woodland Township to the south. Along this borderline, the route comes to the Four Mile Circle, where it intersects the western terminus of Route 72 as well as CR 644 and CR 646. Past the traffic circle, Route 70 becomes the border between Pemberton Township to the north and Woodland Township to the south. The road passes to the south of the wooded Presidential Lakes Estates residential development before turning northeast through more of the Pine Barrens entirely within Pemberton Township. The road passes near some cranberry bogs before intersecting CR 530. At this intersection, CR 530 heads east concurrent with Route 70.

Ocean and Monmouth counties

A short distance later, the two routes enter Manchester Township in Ocean County and continue east through a tract of the Brendan T. Byrne State Forest within the Pine Barrens as well as a corner of the Fort Dix Military Reservation. The road eventually reaches the community of Whiting, where it passes commercial development at the intersection with CR 539. Here, CR 530 turns south to follow CR 539 and Route 70 continues northeast back into the Pine Barrens. The road turns more to the north-northeast before heading east into Lakehurst to the south of the Lakehurst Maxfield Field naval station. In Lakehurst, Route 70 comes to the Eisenhower Traffic Circle with CR 4 and CR 12 before running through residential and commercial areas of the town. It intersects with the southern terminus of CR 547, where it widens into a four-lane divided highway. From here, the route crosses over the Southern Secondary railroad line operated by the Delaware and Raritan River Railroad before coming to the Lakehurst Circle, where it intersects the western terminus of Route 37.

Route 70 enters Manchester Township again past this traffic circle and becomes a two-lane undivided road, passing near the wooded residential Leisure Knoll community before crossing CR 571. Past CR 571, the route heads through wooded suburban residential and business areas, crossing into Toms River. Here, the road intersects CR 527 and CR 637 before becoming a four-lane divided highway again and encountering US 9 at a modified cloverleaf interchange. Following the US 9 interchange, Route 70 enters Lakewood Township and turns more to the east, crossing CR 623 prior to a modified cloverleaf interchange with the Garden State Parkway. From here, the route continues into Brick Township and passes several shopping centers, intersecting CR 528 and CR 549. At the CR 528 intersection, the road is briefly an undivided highway. It turns northeast, crossing the Metedeconk River before intersecting Route 88. After this intersection, Route 70 passes more inhabited areas separated from the road by trees, crossing both CR 632 and CR 549 Spur. A short distance later, it becomes an undivided road and crosses the Manasquan River on the September 11th Memorial Bridge, entering Brielle, Monmouth County. The September 11th Memorial Bridge is dedicated to residents of Monmouth and Ocean counties who lost their lives in the September 11 attacks. After the bridge, the route turns north through residential areas and becomes a divided highway again, briefly forming the border between Wall Township to the west and Brielle to the east before fully entering Wall Township. Route 70 ends at the former Brielle Circle intersection with Route 34 and Route 35, where the road continues north as part of Route 35.

History
The Camden, Ellisburg, and Marlton Turnpike was chartered in 1849 as a turnpike that was to run from Camden east to Marlton along what is today Route 70 and CR 601. The Marlton Pike was taken over by Camden County in 1907 at a time many other turnpikes became public roads. The current alignment of Route 70 between Whitesbog (the west end of the CR 530 concurrency) and Lakehurst was legislated as a part of pre-1927 Route 18 in 1923, a route that was to run from Camden to Toms River. In the 1927 New Jersey state highway renumbering, Route 40 was designated to run from Camden to Lakewood along the current alignment of Route 70. In addition a spur of this route called Route S40 (now Route 72) was designated to head from the route at Four Mile to Manahawkin. Eventually, the eastern terminus of Route 40 was moved to the Laurelton Circle in Brick Township, where it intersected Route 35 (now Route 88) as well as Route 34, which continued north from this point. The western terminus was placed at the Airport Circle with US 30 and US 130 in Pennsauken, ending concurrent with Route 38. In the 1953 New Jersey state highway renumbering, Route 40 was renumbered to Route 70, to avoid conflicting with US 40 in the state. Also, Route 70 was designated onto its current alignment between Route 38 in Pennsauken and Route 34 and Route 35 at the Brielle Circle, removing the concurrency with Route 38 and replacing the portion of Route 34 between the Laurelton Circle and the Brielle Circle.

Since 1953, many changes have occurred to Route 70. Several traffic circles that had existed on the road had been either modified or replaced by at-grade intersections. The Marlton Circle at Route 73 in Marlton was modified in 1974 to allow Route 73 to run straight through the circle. This circle became known for traffic backups and was later replaced with an interchange. Construction on this interchange, which cost $31 million, began in April 2009. In May 2010, the circle was eliminated with a temporary at-grade intersection constructed while the Route 73 bridge over Route 70 was being built. The interchange was completed in June 2011. Also, the Race Track Circle at the intersection with CR 644 (Haddonfield Road) was eventually replaced by an at-grade intersection. The Laurelton Circle at Route 88, built in 1937, was replaced by the 1990s. The Ellisburg Circle at Route 41 and Route 154, was replaced by an intersection with jughandles. The Brielle Circle at the eastern terminus was also converted to an intersection with jughandles in 2001. In conjunction with eliminating the Brielle Circle, Route 70 was also widened between the intersection with Jack Martin Boulevard in Brick Township and the former circle. In July 2004, floods caused by heavy rain washed away a bridge along the route in Southampton Township, leading for it to be replaced. The New Jersey Department of Transportation replaced the September 11th Memorial Bridge over the Manasquan River in a $52 million project that increased capacity on the bridge, added monumental decorations, and increased pedestrian access. Construction was completed in September 2008, two years ahead of schedule.

Major intersections

See also

References

External links

 New Jersey Roads: Route 70
 New Jersey Highway Ends: Route 70
 Speed Limits for State Roads: Route 70

070
Transportation in Burlington County, New Jersey
Transportation in Camden County, New Jersey
Transportation in Monmouth County, New Jersey
Transportation in Ocean County, New Jersey
Transportation in the Pine Barrens (New Jersey)